This Time by Basie (subtitled Hits of the 50's & 60's) is an album released by pianist, composer and bandleader Count Basie featuring jazz versions of contemporary hits recorded in 1963 and originally released on the Reprise label.

Reception

The album won the Best Performance by a Band for Dancing at the 6th Annual Grammy Awards. AllMusic awarded the album 4 stars noting "This Time by Basie swings, smooth and easy but taut, or hot and heavy...  Quincy Jones arranged and conducted This Time by Basie, and the record was successful, returning the Count to the pop charts on the eve of the British Invasion".

Track listing
 "This Could Be the Start of Something Big" (Steve Allen) - 3:15
 "I Left My Heart in San Francisco" (George Cory, Douglass Cross) - 2:30
 "One Mint Julep" (Rudy Toombs) - 4:00
 "The Swingin' Shepherd Blues" (Moe Koffman) - 3:13
 "I Can't Stop Loving You" (Don Gibson) - 4:33
 "Moon River" (Henry Mancini, Johnny Mercer) - 3:07
 "Fly Me to the Moon" (Bart Howard) - 3:12
 "What Kind of Fool Am I?" (Leslie Bricusse, Anthony Newley) - 2:49
 "Walk, Don't Run" (Johnny Smith) - 2:37
 "Nice 'n' Easy"  (Alan Bergman, Marilyn Keith, Lew Spence) – 3:15
 "Theme from The Apartment" (Charles Williams) - 3:15

Personnel 
Count Basie - piano
Al Aarons, Sonny Cohn, Thad Jones, Eddie Preston, Fip Ricard - trumpet
Henry Coker, Urbie Green, Grover Mitchell, Benny Powell - trombone
Marshal Royal - alto saxophone, clarinet
Eric Dixon, Frank Wess - tenor saxophone, flute
Frank Foster - tenor saxophone, clarinet
Charlie Fowlkes - baritone saxophone, bass clarinet, flute
Freddie Green - guitar
Buddy Catlett - bass
Sonny Payne - drums
Quincy Jones - arranger, conductor

References 

1963 albums
Count Basie Orchestra albums
Reprise Records albums
Albums arranged by Quincy Jones
Albums conducted by Quincy Jones
Grammy Award for Best Performance by an Orchestra – for Dancing